Marta Alexandra Cox Villarreal (born 20 July 1997) is a Panamanian footballer who plays as a midfielder for Mexican Liga MX Femenil side Pachuca and the Panama women's national team.

Club career

Club Leon 
In July 2021, Cox signed with Club León. In doing so, she became the first foreign player to join the Liga MX Femenil team.

International goals
Scores and results list Panama's goal tally first

See also
 List of Panama women's international footballers

References

External links 
 
 
 
 
 
 

1997 births
Living people
Sportspeople from Panama City
Panamanian women's footballers
Women's association football midfielders
Club León (women) footballers
Liga MX Femenil players
Panama women's international footballers
Pan American Games competitors for Panama
Footballers at the 2019 Pan American Games
Central American Games bronze medalists for Panama
Central American Games medalists in football
Panamanian expatriate women's footballers
Panamanian expatriate sportspeople in the United States
Expatriate women's soccer players in the United States
Panamanian expatriate sportspeople in Colombia
Expatriate women's footballers in Colombia
Panamanian expatriate sportspeople in Costa Rica
Expatriate women's footballers in Costa Rica
Panamanian expatriate sportspeople in Mexico
Expatriate women's footballers in Mexico